Brett Douglas Williams (born 15 December 1967) is a former Australian cricketer. He was a right-handed medium-pace bowler and lower-order batsman. Williams was a member of the Australia national under-19 cricket team that won the 1988 Youth Cricket World Cup tournament played in Australia. He was the first cricketer to score a century in the U-19 World Cup final where he scored 108 against Pakistan in 1988 final.

He played four first-class and three List A matches for South Australia cricket team between 1988 and 1990 but never fulfilled the talent which he showed at under-19 level.

References

External links
 

1967 births
Living people
Australian cricketers
Cricketers from Sydney
South Australia cricketers